Richard Cameron Brown (born May 15, 1969) is a Canadian former professional ice hockey left winger who played one game for the Vancouver Canucks of the National Hockey League.

Early life 
Brown was born in Saskatoon, Saskatchewan. He played junior hockey with the Weyburn Red Wings and the Brandon Wheat Kings.

Career 
In 2009, Brown was named to the ECHL Hall of Fame Class of 2010 and was inducted into the ECHL Hall of Fame during the 2010 ECHL All-Star Game in Ontario, California. He was the ECHL's all-time leader in penalty minutes until surpassed by Garet Hunt in the 2018–19 ECHL season.

Career statistics

See also
List of players who played only one game in the NHL

References

External links

1969 births
Living people
Adirondack Red Wings players
Baton Rouge Kingfish players
Brandon Wheat Kings players
Canadian ice hockey left wingers
Columbus Chill players
ECHL coaches
Erie Panthers players
Gwinnett Gladiators players
Hamilton Canucks players
Sportspeople from Saskatoon
Milwaukee Admirals players
Rochester Americans players
Undrafted National Hockey League players
Vancouver Canucks players
Ice hockey people from Saskatchewan
Canadian ice hockey coaches
Weyburn Red Wings players